Merry Sherwood is a historic plantation house located at Berlin, Worcester County, Maryland, United States. It is a massive, three-story, five-bay, double-pile, frame dwelling, built about 1859 in the Italianate style. The house is topped by a flat roof, projecting cornice, and a large cupola. The roof of the cupola is capped with a pointed wooden spire.  It is current operated as wedding and special event venue.

Merry Sherwood was listed on the National Register of Historic Places in 1991.

References

External links
, including undated photo, at Maryland Historical Trust
Merry Sherwood Plantation, Bed and Breakfast website

Berlin, Maryland
Houses on the National Register of Historic Places in Maryland
Houses in Worcester County, Maryland
Italianate architecture in Maryland
Houses completed in 1859
Bed and breakfasts in Maryland
National Register of Historic Places in Worcester County, Maryland